This is a list of songs produced by English production trio Stock Aitken Waterman.

1984

1985

(*) denotes an entry on the US Dance Chart.

1986

(*) denotes an entry on the US dance chart.

1987

(*) denotes an entry on the US Dance Chart.

1988

(*) denotes an entry on the US Dance Chart.

1989

(*) denotes an entry on the US Dance Chart.

1990

1991

1992

1993

1994

2007

2010

2015

Legacy releases

1995

1997

2003

2005

2009

2010

2011

2012

2013

2016

Notes

References

Stock Aitken Waterman
 
Stock Aitken Waterman